A supercluster is a large group of smaller galaxy clusters or galaxy groups; they are among the largest known structures in the universe. The Milky Way is part of the Local Group galaxy group (which contains more than 54 galaxies), which in turn is part of the Virgo Supercluster, which is part of the Laniakea Supercluster. The large size and low density of superclusters means that they, unlike clusters, expand with the Hubble expansion. The number of superclusters in the observable universe is estimated to be 10 million.

Existence

The existence of superclusters indicates that the galaxies in the Universe are not uniformly distributed; most of them are drawn together in groups and clusters, with groups containing up to some dozens of galaxies and clusters up to several thousand galaxies. Those groups and clusters and additional isolated galaxies in turn form even larger structures called superclusters.

Their existence was first postulated by George Abell in his 1958 Abell catalogue of galaxy clusters. He called them "second-order clusters", or clusters of clusters.

Superclusters form massive structures of galaxies, called "filaments", "supercluster complexes", "walls" or "sheets", that may span between several hundred million light-years to 10 billion light-years, covering more than 5% of the observable universe. These are the largest structures known to date. Observations of superclusters can give information about the initial condition of the universe, when these superclusters were created. The directions of the rotational axes of galaxies within superclusters are studied by those who believe that they may give insight and information into the early formation process of galaxies in the history of the Universe.
 
Interspersed among superclusters are large voids of space where few galaxies exist. Superclusters are frequently subdivided into groups of clusters called galaxy groups and clusters.

Although superclusters are supposed to be the largest structures in the universe according to the Cosmological principle, larger structures have been observed in surveys, including the Sloan Great Wall.

List of superclusters

Nearby superclusters

Distant superclusters

Extremely distant superclusters

Diagram

See also

 Lists of astronomical objects
 List of largest cosmic structures
 Galaxy
 Galaxy groups and clusters
 Galaxy cluster
 Galaxy filament
 Galaxy group
 Illustris project
 Large-scale structure of the cosmos

References

External links

 Overview of local superclusters
 The Nearest Superclusters
 Universe family tree: Supercluster

 
Large-scale structure of the cosmos